No Man's Land Navy Airfield was an operational United States Navy airfield from 1943 to 1950s. The airfield is located on Nomans Land island, about three miles (5 km) off the southwest corner of the island of Martha's Vineyard, Massachusetts. When it was rarely used, it was only to support propeller aircraft.

See also
 List of military installations in Massachusetts

References

Installations of the United States Navy in Massachusetts
Defunct airports in Massachusetts
Airfields of the United States Navy
Military installations closed in the 1950s
Airports in Dukes County, Massachusetts
Closed installations of the United States Navy
1943 establishments in Massachusetts
1950s disestablishments in Massachusetts